Sister Cupid is a 1987 Hong Kong romantic fantasy comedy film produced by and directed by Guy Lai and starring Jacky Cheung, Carol Cheng, Maggie Cheung and Pat Ha.

Plot
Kam Yu-yee (Carol Cheng) and Kam Kat-cheung (Jacky Cheung) are siblings orphaned at a young age and were dependent on one another since. Yu-yee is a madame of a nightclub who is dedicated in her job is very loving towards her younger brother although she has never been fond of Kat-cheung's girlfriend, Jackie (Pat Ha), who he had met since childhood. In order to retaliate against Yu-yee, Jackie instigates a plan to elope with Kat-cheung, but they end up in a traffic accident on their way and rolled down a mountain slope where Kat-cheung was rescued by a dead spirit who has entrenched for two decades. Since Jackie failed to elope with Kat-cheung, she moves next door to him instead and calls her cousin, Benjamin (Natalis Chan) to retaliate against Yu-yee, much to the annoyance to Kat-cheung. Aside from battling Jackie, Yu-yee also wishes to seek a breakthrough in her career and spends major efforts pleasing her boss, Big Sister (Tang Pik-wan). Big Sister dearly misses her only daughter, Yuk, who drowned to death twenty years ago and holds a dance party annually to commemorate her. To please her boss, Yu-yee suggests to Big Sister she should plan a ghost marriage for Yuk and Yu-yee is tasked to find a ghost son in-law for Big Sister. As the completion time of her task is getting close, Yu-yee gives her brother's birthday and eight characters of horoscope and a jar of peanut powder posing as bone ashes to Big Sister for the ghost marriage. At the night of the wedding, Kat-cheung unknowingly gets drunk in big sister's mansion and sees Yuk dressed in a wedding dress and having deja vu of meeting Yuk before and spend the night together.

Cast
Jacky Cheung as Kam Kat-cheung
Carol Cheng as Madame Kam Yu-yee
Maggie Cheung as Yuk
Pat Ha as Jackie
Tang Pik-wan as Big Sister
Natalis Chan as Ben
Tai Po as Sasi
Fiona Leung as Hostess
Yik Kon-ha as Hostess
Lee Ching as Hostess
Chan Ka-pik as Hostess
Anna Ng as Hostess
Anthony Tang as Band member
David Wu as Band member
Charlie Cho as Band member
Yeung Yau-ching as Big Sister's short footman
Alex Ng as Big Sister's tall footman
Rico Chu as Yu-yee's facial man

Music

Theme song
Lonely Occupation (孤單的佔領)
Composer: Richard Yuen
Lyricist: Keith Chan
Singer: Jacky Cheung

Insert theme
The Amorous Mister (公子多情)
Composer: Ku Kuk
Lyricist: Law Po-sang
Singer: Tang Pik-wan

Reception

Critical
Brns.com rated the film a score of 3.5 out 10 and criticizes its aimless plot, comedy and confusing ending.

Box office
The film grossed HK$11,480,086 at the Hong Kong box office during its theatrical1 run from 16 to 29 April 1987.

See also
Jacky Cheung filmography

References

External links

Sister Cupid at Hong Kong Cinemagic

1987 films
1987 romantic comedy films
1980s romantic fantasy films
Hong Kong romantic comedy films
Hong Kong romantic fantasy films
1980s fantasy comedy films
Hong Kong ghost films
1980s Cantonese-language films
Films set in Hong Kong
Films shot in Hong Kong
1980s Hong Kong films